Shaharah is a sub-district located in Shaharah District, 'Amran Governorate, Yemen. Shaharah  had a population of 4141 according to the 2004 census.

References 

Sub-districts in Shaharah District